The Sitlika Range is a subrange of the Hogem Ranges of the Omineca Mountains, bounded by both the Fall River and Ogden Creek in northern British Columbia, Canada.

References

Sitlika Range in the Canadian Mountain Encyclopedia

Omineca Mountains